Alchemilla murbeckiana is a species of flowering plant belonging to the family Rosaceae.

Its native range is Northern and Eastern Europe to Mongolia, Kamchatka.

References

murbeckiana